The Orthodox Tewahedo biblical canon is a version of the Christian Bible used in the two Oriental Orthodox churches of the Ethiopian and Eritrean traditions: the Ethiopian Orthodox Tewahedo Church and the Eritrean Orthodox Tewahedo Church. At 81 books, it is the largest and most diverse biblical canon in traditional Christendom. 

Western scholars have classified the books of the canon into two categories — the narrower canon, which consists mostly of books familiar to the West, and the broader canon, which includes nine additional books. 

It is not known to exist at this time as one published compilation. Some books, though considered canonical, are nonetheless difficult to locate and are not even widely available in the churches' home countries of Ethiopia and Eritrea.

Narrower canon

Old Testament
The Orthodox Tewahedo narrower Old Testament canon contains the entire established Hebrew protocanon. Moreover, with the exception of the first two books of Maccabees, the Orthodox Tewahedo canon also contains the entire Catholic deuterocanon. In addition to this, the Orthodox Tewahedo Old Testament includes the Prayer of Manasseh, 3 Ezra, and 4 Ezra, which also appear in the canons of other Christian traditions. Unique to the Orthodox Tewahedo canon are the Paralipomena of Jeremiah (4 Baruch), Jubilees, Enoch, and the three books of Meqabyan.

The books of Lamentations, Jeremiah, and Baruch, as well as the Letter of Jeremiah and 4 Baruch, are all considered canonical by the Orthodox Tewahedo churches. Additionally, the 1st, 2nd and 3rd Books of Ethiopian Maccabees are also part of the canon; while they share a common name they are completely different from the books of Maccabees that are known or have been canonized in other traditions. Finally, within the Orthodox Tewahedo tradition, 3 Ezra is called Second Ezra, 4 Ezra is called Ezra Sutu'el, and the Prayer of Manasseh is incorporated into the Second Book of Chronicles.

New Testament
The Orthodox Tewahedo narrower New Testament canon consists of the entire 27 book Christian protocanon, which is almost universally accepted across Christendom.

Broader canon

The broader canon adds to the 27 books of the New Testament the following:

Sinodas (4 books)
Book of Covenant (2 books)
Epistles of Clement (1 book, 3 epistles)
Didaskalia (1 book)

The Ethiopic Didascalia, or Didesqelya, is a book of Church order in 43 chapters, distinct from the Didascalia Apostolorum, but similar to books I–VII of the Apostolic Constitutions, where it most likely originates.

The broader canon seems to have been created by Ethiopian scholars commenting on the Fetha Negest law code, which says that the canon contains 81 books, but only lists 73. The additional eight books were those presumed to be missing from the list.

Translation into English
A project to translate the complete Ethiopian canon into English for the benefit of Ethiopian expatriates is underway.

List of books in the Orthodox Tewahedo Bible

Old Testament
 Genesis
 Exodus
 Leviticus
 Numbers
 Deuteronomy
 Joshua
 Judges
 Ruth
 I and II Samuel
 I and II Kings
 I Chronicles
 II Chronicles (incl. the Prayer of Manasseh)
 Jubilees
 Enoch
 I Ezra
 II Ezra
 Ezra Sutuel
 Tobit
 Judith
 Esther
 I, II and III Meqabyan (Similarly named, but not the same as the four Greek Books of the Maccabees)
 Job
 Psalms
 Messalë (Proverbs ch 1–24)
 Tägsas (Proverbs ch 25–31)
 Wisdom of Solomon
 Ecclesiastes
 Song of Songs
 Isaiah
 Jeremiah (incl. Baruch, Lamentations, Letter of Jeremiah, and 4 Baruch)
 Ezekiel
 Daniel
 Hosea
 Amos
 Micah
 Joel
 Obadiah
 Jonah
 Nahum (or Nahium)
 Habakkuk
 Zephaniah
 Haggai
 Zechariah
 Malachi
 Sirach
 Josippon
New Testament
 Matthew
 Mark
 Luke
 John
 Acts
 Romans
 I Corinthians
 II Corinthians
 Galatians
 Ephesians
 Philippians
 Colossians
 I Thessalonians
 II Thessalonians
 I Timothy
 II Timothy
 Titus
 Philemon
 Hebrews
 I Peter
 II Peter
 I John
 II John
 III John
 James
 Jude
 Revelation
  Sinodos
 Ser`atä Seyon (30 canons)
 Te'ezaz (71 canons)
 Gessew (56 canons)
 Abtelis (81 canons)
 I-II Covenant
 Ethiopic Clement
 Ethiopic Didascalia

Footnotes

Further reading
 Assefa, Daniel. "The Biblical Canon of the Ethiopian Orthodox Tawāhǝdo Church (EOTC)." The Oxford Handbook of the Bible in Orthodox Christianity (2022): 211 ff
 Covenant Christian Coalition. 2022.The Complete 54-Book Apocrypha: 2022 Edition With the Deuterocanon, 1-3 Enoch, Giants, Jasher, Jubilees, Pseudepigrapha, & the Apostolic Fathers. Covenant Press.

External links
  Biblia Aethiopica—August Dillmann et al online edition of the Ethiopic Bible
  The Official Web Site of the Ethiopian Orthodox Bible Project
  What's in Your Bible?—a chart comparing Jewish, Orthodox, Catholic, Syriac, Ethiopic, and Protestant canons (Bible Study Magazine Nov–Dec 08.)
Contantinus Siamakis, Biblical Canon of the Orthodox Christian Church, Studies 1, 2008

Development of the Christian biblical canon
Ethiopian Orthodox Tewahedo Church
Eritrean Orthodox Tewahedo Church
Texts in Ge'ez